"Feels Good (Don't Worry Bout a Thing)" is the only single released from Naughty by Nature's sixth album, IIcons. It was released on April 30, 2002, and featured R&B group 3LW. The single found success, making it to six Billboard charts, including 53 on the Billboard Hot 100. This was Naughty by Nature's only single to not feature DJ Kay Gee on production, instead the production was handled by the remaining members, Treach and Vin Rock.

Single track listing

A-Side
"Feels Good (Don't Worry Bout a Thing)" (Album Mix) - 4:13
"Feels Good (Don't Worry Bout a Thing)" (Album Instrumental) - 4:13
"Feels Good (Don't Worry Bout a Thing)" (Acapella) - 4:09

B-Side
"Feels Good (Don't Worry Bout a Thing)" (Kelly G. Club Mix) - 8:13
"Rah Rah" 4:20 (Featuring Rottin Razkals)

Charts

References

2002 singles
Naughty by Nature songs
TVT Records singles
2002 songs
Songs written by Treach
Song recordings produced by Naughty by Nature
Songs written by Vin Rock
3LW songs